Medora de Vallombrosa, Marquise de Morès (née von Hoffmann) (August 21, 1856 – 1921), was an American heiress who married the Marquis de Mores.

Early life
Medora was the daughter of Louis A. von Hoffman, a wealthy New York banker who was  one of the founders of the Knickerbocker Club, and his wife, Athenais (née Grymes) von Hoffman (1832–1897), whose family had been prominent in Virginia and Louisiana. Her younger sister, Pauline Grymes, was married to the wealthy German industrialist Baron Ferdinand von Stumm whose family owned the Neunkirchen Iron and Steelworks in 1878.

Her maternal grandfather was John Randolph Grymes, the former U.S. Attorney for Western District of Louisiana under President James Madison. Her aunt, and namesake, Medora, was the second wife of banker and lobbyist Samuel Ward. Her uncle, Dr. C. Alfred Grymes, was married to Emma Stebbins (a daughter of U.S. Representative Henry George Stebbins), and, after her death, Mary Helen James (a granddaughter of Federal Vanderburgh and cousin of psychologist William James, author Henry James, and diarist Alice James).

Personal life
In 1882, Medora was married to Antoine Amédée-Marie-Vincent Amot Manca de Vallombrosa, the Marquis de Morès, a French-born nobleman who was a frontier ranchman in the Badlands of Dakota Territory. Before his assassination in 1896, they were the parents of three children, a daughter and two sons:

 Athenais Amot Manca (1883–1969), who married French Ambassador Louis M. Henry Pichon, Baron Pichon (1873–1933), at age 17. In 1929, Athenais married Baron de Graffenried; he died in 1936. She then married Henry Guerracina and moved to Argentina during World War II; returning to France in 1950, where she died in 1969.
 Louis Richard Amot Manca, Duke de Vallombrosa (1885–1959), who grew up in France and was educated at Yale University; he became a banker until 1936 when he retired and moved to Switzerland; he married Marie-Thérèse du Bourg de Bozas at Saint-Pierre-de-Chaillot Church, in October 1917.
 Count Paul Amot Manca de Morès de Vallombrosa (1890–1950), a Harvard graduate who became a banker with the Bankers Trust in Paris before becoming a partner in the Paris brokerage house of Saint Phalle & Co.; he married Ruth (née Obre) Goldbeck, widow of Walter Dean Goldbeck, an American portrait painter, and sister of Arthur Obre, in 1928. They divorced in 1935 and she married race car driver André Dubonnet in 1937.

After the assassination of the Marquis de Morès in 1896, the Marquise de Morès lived in both Paris and Cannes, France. During World War I, she turned her home into a hospital for wounded soldiers. She died at Cannes in 1921 of a leg injury she received while working as a nurse. The wound never fully healed.  Others say she died of an infectious disease she acquired while touring India with her husband. This gave her bouts of illness throughout her life which eventually resulted in her death.Medora Vallambrosa, Marquise de Mores State Historical Society of North Dakota

Legacy
The town of Medora, North Dakota, founded in 1883, was named by the Marquis in her honor. The Marquis's meat packing plant failed and the town fell into a decline after the family left. However, the story of the Marquis de Mores and Medora are now featured in The Medora Musical held every summer in Medora, a major tourist town in the North Dakota Badlands. The 26-room clapboard-sided ranch house the Marquis built for his heiress wife, known as the "Chateau de Mores", has been restored, and tours of it are given.

References

External links
 Marquise de Mores (1862-1921), 1889 miniature portrait, at the New-York Historical Society
 Photo of Medora Vallambrosa, Marquise de Morès
 State Historical Society of North Dakota, Medora Vallambrosa, Marquise de Mores
 Antonio Areddu. Il marchesato di Mores. Le origini, il duca dell´Asinara, le lotte antifeudali, l´abolizione del feudo e le vicende del marquis de Morès, Condaghes, Cagliari 2011.
 Antonio Areddu, Vita e morte del marchese di Mores Antoine Manca (1858-1896), Cagliari, Condaghes, 2018

1856 births
1921 deaths
Female wartime nurses
People from Billings County, North Dakota
American women in World War I
American expatriates in France
Female nurses in World War I
19th-century American women
French marchionesses